Lady Slipper Lake is a lake in Lyon County, in the U.S. state of Minnesota.

Lady Slipper Lake was named for state flower of Minnesota, the lady's slipper (Cypripedium reginae).

References

Lakes of Minnesota
Lakes of Lyon County, Minnesota